The mining industry of Sierra Leone accounted for 4.5 percent of the country's GDP in 2007 and minerals made up 79 percent of total export revenue with diamonds accounting for 46 percent of export revenue in 2008.  The main minerals mined in Sierra Leone are diamonds, rutile, bauxite, gold, iron and limonite.

Mining in Sierra Leone has been seen as one of the key factors for instability in the country and one of the reasons for the country's recent civil war. Traditionally, benefits from diamond mining have ended up with private  companies and corrupt officials rather than the country's government and people.

The Ministry of Mineral Resources is responsible for the management of the country's minerals sector and the Mines and Minerals Act 2009. Sierra Leone is a candidate for the Extraction Industries Transparency Initiative (EITI). GoSL publishes data on licenses and payments by mining companies on their Online Repository established by Revenue Development Foundation, the repository was launched in January 2012.

History
Organised mining began in the 1920s with bauxite first being recorded in 1920 along the Falaba to Waia road.  Diamonds were found in the early 1930s, from 1934 to 1956 the Sierra Leone Selection Trust (SLST) held the monopoly for mining, prospecting for and marketing diamonds throughout Sierra Leone. The Consolidated African Selection Trust Ltd (CAST), which owned mining operation around West Africa, provided the initial capital for the SLST.

The monopoly was originally given for 99 years but in 1955 the SLST gave up rights to alluvial deposits outside its lease area.  This allowed artisan and small scale mining of alluvial deposits, and by 1965 there had been a large movement from agricultural work to working these deposits.  In 1970 a joint SLST and government organisation was formed called the National Diamond Mining Corporation (NDMC).

Before the start of the Civil War in 1991 250,000 people made a living in the mining and quarrying sector with direct and indirect employment accounting for 14% of the country's total labour force.  The mineral wealth of Sierra Leone, especially in diamonds, became a key factors in its instability and the outbreak of Civil War.

Resource Curse
Despite being among the top-ten diamond-producing nations, the mining sector faces many challenges, including weak laws and smuggling issues.   Sierra Leone is losing large revenue that could have been earned from taxes and licensing agreements. Those revenues could be reinvested for example in the healthcare sector to help those people whose health is affected by mining operations.

Research suggests that 50% of Sierra Leone’s diamonds were smuggled annually.   NACE argues that with good institutional reforms, Sierra Leone can increase mineral exports seven-fold by 2020.   Sierra Leone’s mining performance is extremely poor as compared to Botswana, where mining contributes approximately 38% to their GDP.

Rutile
Sierra Leone is ranked as one of the top five producers of rutile, a titanium ore, used in paint pigment and welding rod coatings.  The government issued leases for mining rutile are held by Sierra Rutile Limited which is owned by Titanium Resources Group which is owned by European and U.S investors. These leases cover 580 km2 of land where there are 19 identified deposits of rutile.  In 2009 the Government of Sierra Leone received Le 1,854 million in royalties from rutile mining.

In 2009 production decreased by 19.07 percent to 63,860 tons, and exports were worth US$ 35,920,300.

On 8 December 2016, Sierra Rutile Limited, Sierra Leone's largest rutile producer, was acquired by Australian mineral sands miner Iluka Resources.

Gold
Gold mining in Sierra Leone consisted of small scale operation exploiting alluvial deposits.  After the end of the Sierra Leone Civil War exploration of gold grew and by 2013 to 2015 new modern mines are expected to be in production.  In 2010 Cluff Gold, a British company, found gold deposits in the rocks of the southern Kangari hills and is planning to build a mechanised mine to extract it.

In 2009 production levels of gold fell by 17.71 percent to 5060 Troy Ounces (157 kg) from 6150 Troy Ounces (191 kg) in 2008.  This was due to a drop in mining activity in the second half of the year and was despite a rise in the price of gold on the global market. The drop may also have been due to increased smuggling as the Government of Sierra Leone had raised the duty to higher than the neighboring countries. The increase in the value of gold meant gold exports were worth 15.73 percent more at US$4,764,000 in 2009 compared to US$4,116,400 in 2008.

Diamonds

Diamonds are found in about a quarter of Sierra Leone in the south-east and east of the country, with the  diamond fields cover 7,700 square miles.  The main production areas are concentrated around the drainage areas of rivers in the Kono, Kenema and Bo Districts. In the Kono, Kenema, Bo and Pujehun Districts there are 1,700 artisanal mining licenses in operation.

In 2009 the government recorded exports of 400,480 carats (80,096 g) of diamonds, this included 143,620 carats (28,724 g) of industrial diamonds and 256,860 (51,372 g) of gem diamonds.  This was and increase of 7.86 percent on the previous year which was a result of legislative changes, in the form of a new mining law, to enable fees and royalties to be collected more effectively and an increase in the amount of diamond mining. Diamond exports were worth US$ 78,373,900 in 2009 accounting for 59 percent of the country's exports. The drop in the value of diamonds on the world market meant that the value of diamond exports decreased by 20.68 percent in 2009 compared to 2008.

The largest diamond found in Sierra Leone, and the third largest diamond in the world, was a 969.8 carat (194 g) rough diamond.  It was found in 1972 and named the An-al of Sierra Leone.

Sierra Leone should have been one of the world’s richest countries, being blessed with resources, including gold and diamonds. However, it remains one of the world’s poorest countries, ranking 203 out of 206 countries by World Development Report. Wealth that diamonds should have brought is not evident, and Sierra Leone is still emerging from scars from the recent brutal Sierra Leone Civil War, which was fuelled by illicit diamond trading.  Revenue from mining in Sierra Leone has not been redistributed to benefit the larger population.   The mining industry contributed 4.5% towards its gross domestic product (GDP) in 2007.   Economic development is low due to poor management of resources and unrealized potential revenue.

Bauxite
Sierra Leone's production of bauxite, an aluminium ore, is around one percent of the total global production.  Deposits occur between Moyamba and Mano, on the Freetown Peninsular, at Krim-Kpaka in the Pujehun District, southern Sierra Leone; in north on the road from Falaba to Waia, at Kamakwie and Makumre.

Sierra Minerals Holdings is the only company mining bauxite in the country, and the second largest employer in the mining industry.  It runs the Sieromco Bauxite Mine as well as holding the mining lease to 321.7 km2.  In 2009 production of bauxite fell by 22.17 percent to 742,820 tons. This was due to Sierra Minerals ceasing production from June to September 2009 as a response to falling global demand for aluminum, which is produced from bauxite.

Cultural references
The mining industry in Sierra Leone is the central focus of Kanye West’s 2005 single Diamonds from Sierra Leone. West speaks about the poor working conditions of the miners in Sierra Leone and the effect of the first world’s luxurious and expensive lifestyles on the third world mining industries in Africa, specifically the expensive diamonds exported from Sierra Leone. Kanye emphasizes the illegal diamond trade in Sierra Leone as a leading factor resulting in a gruesome civil war. The song hit top 50 on the US Billboard Top 100 in 2005 and received high praise.

Governance

Institutions
Inefficiency and corruption of Sierra Leone’s institutions are impeding its economic growth.  Absence of well-established institutions is the result of the destructive civil war which ended only in 2002.  World Bank’s assistance brought reforms but also allowed local government to become lax.  The Ministry of Mineral Resources (Sierra Leone)(MMR) administers the regulations and property rights of the Mines and Minerals Act (Sierra Leone) in 2009.  However, licences made by mining companies were only published in 2011.

This reflects inefficiency in establishing a legal framework due to time-lag.
It is also questionable whether there are proper corruption-checking mechanisms.  Although the Sierra Leone Anti-corruption Commission (ACC) investigates corruption cases, critics have that noted it could merely be a political tool to quieten the government’s political opponents.  However, the ACC objects to this and claims it is impartial.  Pervasive corruption and unstable political environment stymie Sierra Leone’s economic growth and decrease investors’ confidence in Sierra Leone’s business and political climate.

Mining industry and other Economic Sectors
Policies regarding well-management of mining industry should be done alongside a broader focus for the economy’s development, and greater efforts should be done to expand the manufacturing and service sector, which currently only contribute 12% to the GDP.  Sierra Leone produces raw diamonds but gem-quality diamonds are manufactured in developed countries like Belgium.  For example, the government of Sierra Leone can provide greater tax incentives for investors to conduct businesses and invest in Sierra Leone, to facilitate the transfer of technology and skills to the native workers.  One recent example is the Gemstone School Sierra Leone, which was established as an institution to improve diamond polishing, cutting and jewelry-manufacturing skills to boost job-training and employment opportunities locally and to attract overseas investors.

More efforts from the government and Multi-National Corporations can hence be done in the future to build more diamond-processing facilities and plants in Sierra Leone to boost the diamond mining industry.

References

 
Economy of Sierra Leone
Sierra Leone